Yu Juan (1979-April 19, 2011) was a teacher in Fudan University and the writer of the book An Unfinished Life. Yu Juan was diagnosed with breast cancer at the age of 30. During her fight with cancer, her persistent efforts to the public for cancer prevention touched millions of people through her popular blog called To Live is the Permanent Truth.

Her life 
Born in Jining, Shandong, Yu Juan earned her Master degree from Universitetet i Oslo in Norway, and Ph.D. from Fudan University. She led a happy life in a family with her husband and son, but when she was in the prime of her career, she was diagnosed with breast cancer.

During the time she was hospitalized fighting the disease, she created a blog called To Live is the Truth.  She kept a diary about her thoughts towards life. As she said, in the eye of a patient suffering from cancer, the most valuable thing in life was the optimistic state of mind and the most valuable time was when you stay with your family, while the other things really were not worth anything. Her strong will towards life and contribution to the society encouraged and inspired all her readers. As an extremely warm-hearted person, she sacrificed her recovering time to keep the diary to remind people of unhealthy living habits that might result in cancer.

Social effect 
After one and a half years’ illness, Yu Juan died on April 19, 2011. The matter received news coverage, and thousands of people sent their wishes for Yujuan. To everyone’s surprise, her final wish was to protect energy forests in northeast China. Her family collected her articles and published the book An Unfinished Life in her memory.

References

Chinese bloggers
Chinese women bloggers
Deaths from cancer in the People's Republic of China
2011 deaths
People's Republic of China writers
1979 births
Academic staff of Fudan University
Writers from Jining
Educators from Shandong
Chinese autobiographers
Deaths from breast cancer